The 1970 World Cup took place 12–15 November at The Jockey Club in San Isidro 28 kilometers north of the center of Buenos Aires, Argentina. It was the 18th World Cup event.

The tournament was a 72-hole stroke play team event with 43 teams. 44 teams were invited, but the Czechoslovakia team of amateurs Jiri Dvorak and Jan Kunšta withdraw from the tournament before it began. Each team consisted of two players from a country. The combined score of each team determined the team results.

The Australia team of Bruce Devlin and David Graham won, with a record aggregate of 544, by eight strokes over the Japan team of Takaaki Kono and Haruo Yasuda. Australia held a record advantage of 19 strokes going into the final round. This was the third victory for Australia in the history of the World Cup, until 1967 named the Canada Cup. The individual competition was won by Roberto De Vicenzo, Argentina one stroke ahead of Graham. The event was dedicated to the 47-year-old home hero De Vicenzo, who had participated in 15 Canada Cup/World Cup events played and shared in Argentina's victory in the 1953 inaugural event.

Henrik Lund, Denmark, made a hole-in-one on the par 3 12th hole in the first round.

Teams 
This list is incomplete.

(a) denotes amateur

Scores
Team

International Trophy

Sources:

References

World Cup (men's golf)
Golf tournaments in Argentina
World Cup
World Cup